Eulithis is a Holarctic genus of moths in the family Geometridae erected by Jacob Hübner in 1821.

Species
 Eulithis achatinellaria (Oberthür, 1880)
 Eulithis albicinctata (Püngeler, 1909)
 Eulithis convergenata (Bremer, 1864)
 Eulithis destinata (Moschler, 1860)
 Eulithis diversilineata (Hübner, [1813]) – lesser grapevine looper
 Eulithis explanata (Walker, 1862)
 Eulithis flavibrunneata (McDunnough, 1943)
 Eulithis gracilineata (Guenée, 1858) – greater grapevine looper
 Eulithis ledereri (Bremer, 1864)
 Eulithis ludovica (Oberthür, 1899)
 Eulithis luteolata (Hulst, 1896)
 Eulithis mellinata (Fabricius, 1787) – spinach
 Eulithis molliculata (Walker, 1862)
 Eulithis peloponnesiaca (Rebel, 1902)
 Eulithis perspicuata (Püngeler, 1909)
 Eulithis phylaca (Dyar, 1916)
 Eulithis populata (Linnaeus, 1758) – northern spinach
 Eulithis propulsata (Walker, 1862)
 Eulithis prunata (Linnaeus, 1758) – phoenix
 Eulithis pulchraria (Leech, 1897)
 Eulithis pyropata (Hübner, 1809)
 Eulithis roessleraria (Staudinger, 1870)
 Eulithis serrataria (Barnes & McDunnough, 1917)
 Eulithis testata (Linnaeus, 1761) – chevron
 Eulithis xylina (Hulst, 1896)

References

Cidariini